Tenley may refer to:

Tenley Campus, satellite campus of American University
Tenley Circle, traffic circle in Washington, D.c.
Tenley Park, park in Everett, Pennsylvania

People with the given name
Tenley Albright (born 1935), American figure skater
Tenley Molzahn (born 1984), American television personality

Other uses
Tenley (given name)